Oyama is a neighbourhood and formal ward located within the district municipality of Lake Country, which is located in the Okanagan region in British Columbia, Canada. It is located at the north end of Wood Lake and at the south end of Kalamalka Lake opposite BC Highway 97.

Name origin
Oyama is named after Japanese Field Marshal Ōyama Iwao in 1906 by the first post master Dr. W. H. Irvine.

Climate

Education
It is home to Oyama Traditional School, a public elementary school that is part of the School District 23 Central Okanagan, which is based in Kelowna.

References 

Neighbourhoods in Lake Country